Pidie Regency (also known as: Pidie, Pědir; "king of") is a regency of Aceh Special region, in Indonesia. It is located in the north of the island of Sumatra, in Western Indonesia, bordered by the Malacca Strait and Pidie Jaya Regency (which was formerly a part of Pidie Regency until it was separated out in 2007) in the north, Aceh Besar Regency in the west, Bireuen Regency in the northeast, and Aceh Jaya Regency in the south. The regency covers an area of 3,184.45 square kilometres and had a population of 379,108 people at the 2010 Census and 435,275 at the 2020 Census; the official estimate as at mid 2021 was 439,398. Pidie was the largest rice-producing area of Aceh province, producing some 20% of its total output.

People from Pidie control various markets in Aceh special region, in the neighbouring province of North Sumatra (specifically its Medan City), and in the neighboring country of Malaysia.

Administrative divisions 
The regency is divided administratively into twenty-three districts (kecamatan), listed below with their areas and their populations at the 2010 Census and the 2020 Census, together with the official estimates as at mid 2021. The table also includes the locations of the district administrative centres, the number of administrative villages (desa and kelurahan) in each district, and its post code.

Notable people
Zaini Abdullah (governor of Aceh 2013 - 2018).
Teungku Chik di Tiro (Indonesian National Hero).
Daud Beureueh (Military Governor of aceh).
Teuku Mohammad Hasan (The first governor of Sumatra).
Ibrahim Hasan (former governor of Aceh and Former Minister for Food).
Hasballah M Saad (Former minister of indonesian human rights).
Hasan Tiro (Founder and command center of GAM).
Sanusi Juned (Former chief minister of Malaysian).
Ismail Hassan Metareum (Party chairman and Advisory specially Indonesian delegation to the UN).
Ibrahim Risjad or Richard (influential businessmen in Indonesian).
Teuku Iskandar (scholar, one of the founders of Syiah Kuala University Aceh).

References 

Regencies of Aceh
People from Pidie Jaya Regency